The Connacht Senior League was an association football league featuring amateur, intermediate, and League of Ireland reserve teams affiliated to the Connacht Football Association. It was a third level league in the Republic of Ireland football league system. An earlier provincial league, the Western League, had been active, on and off, since the 1930s before the Connacht Football Association decided to establish a more permanent league. The CSL was active between 1981 and 2000. In 2013 discussions were held about relaunching the league.

History

Western League
The Connacht Football Association first established a provincial league in the 1930s. The Western League had a stop start history and was active up until the early 1970s. Galway, Sligo, Mayo and Roscommon organized their own qualifying rounds, using either a knock-out or round-robin format. The most successful team from this era was Galway Bohemians who were Western League champions on six occasions. Other participants in the Western League included Galway Rovers, Castlebar Celtic and Westport United.

1980s

In 1981–82 seven clubs – Mervue United, Sligo Rovers Reserves, Castlerea Celtic, Salthill Devon, Ballina Rovers, Tuam Celtic and UCG – formed the Connacht Senior League. Sligo Rovers were the inaugural champions while Mervue United won the following two titles. Ballinasloe Town joined during this time and Galway United reserves who also won two titles in a row after Mervues brace. In 1986 there was a proposal for the league to expand into a North West League. This idea was abandoned following the emergence of the Ulster Senior League however the potential financial strain of the North West league saw Castlerea Celtic and Ballina Rovers return to junior league status while Sligo Rovers had already pulled their reserve team in 1985 likely due to losses arising from their senior sides demotion to the League of Ireland First Division. After one season in 1986-87 which only consisted of six clubs, all from county Galway, membership started to improve with Mayo clubs Castlebar Celtic, Westport United and Ballina Town joining. Gentex of Athlone also joined for the 1987–88 season but withdrew in spring due to membership not being sanctioned by the Leinster Football Association. That same season also saw a Connacht Senior League XI take part in the League of Ireland cup generally appearing in a four team midwest group.

1990s
The decade began with first titles for UCG followed by Salthill but with Tuam Celtic departing. Sligo Rovers Reserves rejoined  after an attempt to join the Ulster Senior League was blocked by the Connacht FA and Mervue also rejoined after a two season absence beginning in 89 while Longford Town Reserves became the first new entrant in the nineties. Salthill Devons title saw them become the first CSL champions to be invited to play in the League of Ireland Cup replacing the league XI who'd taken part previously. In 1992–93 Mervue United won a quartet, winning the league title, the Shield, the Connacht Senior Cup and the Connacht Senior League Challenge Cup.This was followed by further membership increase including Gentex of Athlone rejoining with neighbours St.Peters followed by Straide & Foxford United and Galway Hibernians. A move to create two divisions began with the 1994–95 league split into two groups with the winner of each group meeting in a title play-off final. Newcomers Straide & Foxford United beat Castlebar Celtic 1-0 to become champions. The top three teams from the 1994–95 groups plus the winner of a play-off between the two fourth placed teams made up the Premiership for the 1995-96 season. UCG won the Premiership while Ballinasloe Town were the First Division winners. However the two division format was abandoned and the 1996–97 season saw the league revert to a single division and membership began to dwindle. Between 1996–97 and 1999–2000 Mervue United were league champions four times in a row but the league disbanded at this point when Mervue United and NUI Galway opted to enter the League of Ireland U21 Division and Castlebar Celtic decided to return to the Mayo Association Football League.

Possible revival
In April 2013 discussions involving John Delaney and the Football Association of Ireland were held regarding reviving the Connacht Senior League. Representatives of thirteen clubs were invited to a meeting hosted by the Connacht Football Association at the McWilliam Park Hotel in Claremorris. The thirteen invited clubs included Westport United, Castlebar Celtic, Ballina Town, Salthill Devon, Mervue United, the Galway United Supporters’ Trust, NUI Galway, Sligo Rovers, St John's Athletic, Ballinsloe Town, Longford Town, Athlone Town and Willow Park. It was suggested that Salthill Devon and Mervue United would play in the new Connacht Senior League after they dropped out of the League of Ireland First Division to make way for the new Galway United. However, in June 2013 the Connacht Tribune reported that the plans were shelved due to a lack of sufficient interest from the clubs. The three League of Ireland clubs, Sligo Rovers, Athlone Town and Longford Town, favoured a summer league, while the organisers had proposed a September to May format.

League Pyramid system 
There is currently no promotion or relegation system between the League of Ireland First Division (Level 2) and the provincial leagues (Level 3) in place.

Cup competitions
In addition to playing in the Connacht Senior League, clubs from the league were also eligible to play in a number of cup competitions. When the league was formed in 1981–82, the organizers also introduced two cup competitions. Mervue United defeated Sligo Rovers Reserves in the final of the inaugural League Cup, a pre-season competition featuring two legs per round. In 1988–89 this competition was renamed the League Shield. The second cup competition was the Connacht Senior League Challenge Cup. This was played at the end of the season. Mervue United were the inaugural winners. In 1982–83 a third cup, the Incentive Cup, was introduced. It initially featured the two most improved sides who had failed to win another trophy. Tuam Celtic were the first winners. In 1989–90 the format was changed to include teams knocked out in the first round of the Challenge Cup. Castlebar Celtic became the first winners under the new format. In 1986–87 CSL teams, together with Ulster Senior League teams played in the one-off North West Cup. Galway United reached the final but lost to Derry City. Connacht Senior League teams also played in the Connacht Senior Cup and national cup competitions such as FAI Cup, the FAI Intermediate Cup and the FAI Junior Cup. From 1990–91 onwards, the CSL champions or best placed non-reserve team were also invited to play in the League of Ireland Cup. Salthill Devon, Castlebar Celtic and Mervue United all went on to play in this competition.

Representative team
In 1983–84 a Connacht Senior League representative team played a Munster Senior League XI and lost 2–1. In 1986–87 the representative team defeated Munster and a Leinster Senior League XI in an Interprovincial series. Between 1987–88 and 1990–91 the representative team played in the League of Ireland Cup. On all four occasions they played in a regional group that also included Galway United's first team, Limerick and Newcastle West.

Teams
Participating clubs included the reserve teams of three League of Ireland clubs – Sligo Rovers, Galway United and Longford Town. The league also featured three future members of the A Championship – Mervue United, Salthill Devon and Castlebar Celtic. The former two also played in the League of Ireland First Division. Nineteen different teams played in the league at one point or another. The majority came from Connacht but Leinster teams from bordering counties were also invited to join. The league's membership usually averaged between eight and ten clubs and peaked in the 1995–96 season when it featured fourteen clubs. Throughout its history the CSL suffered regularly from clubs dropping out and only two teams, Salthill Devon and UCG/NUI Galway featured every season.

List of winners

Notes

References

 
3
Defunct third level football leagues in Europe
1
Reserve football leagues in Europe